Richard Smith (died 18 November 1909) was an English footballer. He started his Newton Heath career in 1894. He played for the club for seven seasons, scoring 37 goals.

References
General
MUFC Info profile
Specific

Year of birth missing
1909 deaths
Footballers from Bolton
English footballers
Association football forwards
Halliwell Rovers F.C. players
Heywood Central F.C. players
Manchester United F.C. players
Wigan County F.C. players
Bolton Wanderers F.C. players
Wigan United A.F.C. players
English Football League players